Twelve Poems of Emily Dickinson is a song cycle for medium voice and piano by the American composer Aaron Copland.

Completed in 1950 and lasting for just under half an hour, it represents Copland's longest work for solo voice. He assigned the first line of each poem as the song title, Emily Dickinson having not titled any of the pieces. The exception is "The Chariot", which was Dickinson's original published title.

Each song is dedicated to a composer friend. The sequence, with dedicatees, is:

 Nature, the Gentlest Mother (David Diamond)
There Came a Wind Like a Bugle (Elliott Carter)
Why Do They Shut Me Out of Heaven? (Ingolf Dahl)
The World Feels Dusty (Alexei Haieff)
Heart, We Will Forget Him! (Marcelle de Manziarly)
Dear March, Come In! (Juan Orrego-Salas)
Sleep Is Supposed to Be (Irving Fine)
When They Come Back (Harold Shapero)
I Felt a Funeral in My Brain (Camargo Guarnieri)
I've Heard an Organ Talk Sometimes (Alberto Ginastera)
Going to Heaven! (Lukas Foss)
The Chariot (Arthur Berger)

Copland himself acknowledged that many have heard the influence of Charles Ives, Gustav Mahler, and Gabriel Fauré in the songs. In his own memoirs, he made the link between Dickinson's and Mahler's preoccupation with death, however he stated that he recognized no direct musical influence. Nonetheless, writers have frequently cited the fifth song in particular, "Heart, We Will Forget Him!" as being Copland at his most Mahlerian. This is perhaps even more evident the orchestral setting, which he began in 1958. Completed in 1970, Eight Poems of Emily Dickinson for small orchestra omits 3, 8, 9 and 10 from the original sequence.

The original version was premiered at Columbia University on 18 May 1950, with soloist Alice Howland accompanied by the composer. It was not especially well-received by critics, prompting Copland to note wryly to Leonard Bernstein, "that I decided I must have written a better cycle than I had realized." The premiere of the orchestration was given on 14 November 1970 at the Metropolitan Museum of Art, New York City, with soloist Gwendolyn Killebrew and the Juilliard Orchestra conducted by Michael Tilson Thomas. Tilson Thomas subsequently recorded the cycle for EMI with Barbara Hendricks and the London Symphony Orchestra.

Both versions have been recorded many times since their respective premieres.

Discography
 No. 3: "Why Do They Shut Me Out Of Heaven?", with Frederica von Stade (mezzo-soprano) and Martin Katz (piano), CBS, 1982

References

Song cycles by Aaron Copland
Classical song cycles in English
1950 compositions
Music dedicated to family or friends
Death in music
Emily Dickinson